The California Strawberry Festival is an annual strawberry festival that takes place in Ventura, California, United States. The event is held at the Ventura County Fairgrounds on the third weekend of May. The festival was held at College Park, adjacent to Oxnard College, from 1991 to 2019. The California Strawberry Festival began in 1984 and was originally held at Channel Islands Harbor.

The 2020, 2021, and 2022 events were canceled due to the COVID-19 pandemic. The festival is scheduled to resume in 2023.

Local production

See also
List of strawberry topics

References

External links

Festivals in California
Food and drink festivals in the United States
Culture of Oxnard, California
Strawberry festivals
1984 establishments in California
Festivals established in 1984